Shixing County (postal: Chihing) is a county of Shaoguan, Guangdong province, China, bordering Jiangxi province to the east. The native variety of Chinese in the area is Hakka.

Climate

References

County-level divisions of Guangdong
Shaoguan